Bénarville is a commune in the Seine-Maritime department in the Normandy region in northern France.

Geography

Population

Places of interest
 The fifteenth century fortified house.
 The church of St.Germain, dating from the twelfth century.

See also
Communes of the Seine-Maritime department

References

External links

Communes of Seine-Maritime